Streamtech Systems Technologies, Inc. is a Philippine telecommunications company. Founded by Manuel Paolo A. Villar (son of real estate magnate and politician Manuel Villar Jr.), it offers communication services such as fiber to the home, internet and cable television bundles (through Planet Cable) and internet for small businesses and large enterprises.

History

Early years
Planet Cable was founded in 2000 by Manuel Villar, Jr. It began its cable TV services in Cavite and Laguna.

Congressional franchise, formal launch
Paolo Villar founded the company around in 2017. The following year in 2018, it obtained its 25-year Congressional franchise to operate telecommunication system under Republic Act No. 11089.

It was also interested to bid for the country's third major telecommunications provider, but were backed out after internal discussions.

In 2020, the Villar Group formally launched the fixed-line broadband internet business of Streamtech, including a peering partnership with Tier 1 for its global upstream services. The company also completed its acquisition of Planet Cable.

In 2021, Planet Cable acquired Advanced Media Broadcasting System, the company operating the radio station 103.5 K-Lite and TV network All TV from the Vera family.

See also
Telecommunications in the Philippines
Vista Land
Vista Malls

References

Telecommunications companies of the Philippines
Companies based in Cavite
Companies established in 2000